MTV Classic was an Italian pay television channel that centred its programming schedule to former music video hits from the 1970s, 1980s and 1990s. The channel was based on the Videomusic library. It was launched on 2007 as MTV Gold, and was rebranded as MTV Classic on 10 January 2011. It was closed down on 31 July 2015, along with MTV Hits.

External links
 MTV.it 

2007 establishments in Italy
2015 disestablishments in Italy
MTV channels
Defunct television channels in Italy
Italian-language television stations
Music organisations based in Italy
Music television channels
Telecom Italia Media
Television channels and stations established in 2007
Television channels and stations disestablished in 2015